Mark Brewer may refer to:

Mark Brewer (illustrator), American artist
Mark Brewer (Michigan Democrat), American lawyer and political consultant
Mark S. Brewer (1837–1901), Republican politician from Michigan
Mark Brewer (army), Australian army officer who has received the Conspicuous Service Cross twice